Michael "Miguel" Happoldt is an American musician, producer, songwriter, mixing engineer, and label executive. Happoldt was born July 5, 1969, in Atlanta, Georgia, and raised between Virginia Beach, Virginia, and Lakeland, Florida. Upon graduating high school in 1987, he moved to Carson, California, to attend California State University, Dominguez Hills, where he studied audio recording and music production.

While at CSUDH, he met the alternative rock group The Ziggens. He began recording and producing with the group and eventually joining to record their first album, C0002. Inspired by the punk rock and DIY movements of SST Records, BYO and Dischord Records records, in 1989 Happoldt created the logo and label called Skunk Records and released The Ziggens' album on cassette.

In 1990, Happoldt moved to Long Beach, California, where he met Sublime's Bradley Nowell at a party. Happoldt invited Sublime to make some live-to-DAT recordings. Intrigued by The Ziggens' cassette release, Brad Nowell played a four-song demo for Happoldt, which Nowell had recorded before meeting Happoldt, and asked put it out on Skunk Records.

Happoldt has been involved in some capacity with The Long Beach Dub Allstars, the supergroup Volcano, Lucky Boys Confusion, Unwritten Law, Slightly Stoopid, and Long Beach Shortbus.

Following Bradley Nowell's 1996 death, Happoldt cared for Nowell's dalmatian dog and Sublime mascot Lou Dog. Lou Dog died on September 17, 2001.

Since 2010, Happoldt formed and has led the band Perro Bravo, and they have released three albums to date.

References

Living people
American rock musicians
Year of birth missing (living people)
Long Beach Dub Allstars members
Volcano (supergroup) members